The American Joint Committee on Cancer (AJCC) is an organization best known for defining and popularizing cancer staging standards, officially the AJCC staging system.

The American Joint Committee on Cancer (AJCC) was established in 1959 to formulate and publish systems of classification of cancer, including staging and end results reporting, which will be acceptable to and used by the medical profession for selecting the most effective treatment, determining prognosis, and continuing evaluation of cancer control measures.

Membership 
The AJCC has 20 member organizations.  Membership is reserved for those organizations whose missions or goals are consistent with or complementary to those of the AJCC. These organizations generally demonstrate involvement or activity in one or more of the following areas: cancer epidemiology, patient care, cancer control, cancer registration, professional education, research, or biostatistics.

These organizations include:
 American Association of Pathologists' Assistants
 American Cancer Society
 American College of Physicians
 American College of Radiology
 American College of Surgeons
 American Head and Neck Society
 American Society for Radiation Oncology
 American Society of Clinical Oncology
 American Society of Colon and Rectal Surgeons
 American Urological Association
 Canadian Partnership Against Cancer
 Centers for Disease Control and Prevention
 College of American Pathologists
 International Collaboration on Cancer Reporting
 National Cancer Institute
 National Cancer Registrars Association
 National Comprehensive Cancer Network
 North American Association of Central Cancer Registries
 Society of Gynecologic Oncology
 Society of Surgical Oncology
 Society of Urologic Oncology

Objectives 
The objectives of the AJCC are to:

Facilitate a timely and rigorous, evidence-based process to support a biologically relevant system for classification and outcome prediction of cancer that is compatible with systems of cancer population surveillance.
Proactively educate the oncology community through the development and delivery of effective programs and products to guide patient care.
Promulgate research and serve as the clearinghouse to support the development of clinically relevant predictive tools, prognostic factors, and other indicators that classify and predict cancer.
Foster collaborative relationships with AJCC member organizations and organizations with similar objectives in support of systems to diagnose and treat cancer.
Support and be responsive to public and private efforts to improve care and predict outcomes for cancer patients.

References 
https://www.facs.org/quality-programs/cancer-programs/american-joint-committee-on-cancer/cancer-staging-systems/

External links
 Official page

Joint committees